Chalfont may refer to:

United Kingdom
 A collection of villages in Buckinghamshire, England known collectively as "The Chalfonts":
 Chalfont St Giles 
 Chalfont St Peter
 Little Chalfont
 Chalfont Common, in Buckinghamshire, England
 Chalfont & Latimer station, a station on the London Underground Metropolitan Line which serves The Chalfonts
 Chalfont Viaduct, a railway bridge in Gerrards Cross, close to Chalfont St Peter
 Leeds Castle, used as the fictional seat of the Dukes of Chalfont in the 1949 Ealing Comedy Kind Hearts and Coronets

United States
 Chalfont, Pennsylvania, borough located in Bucks County, Pennsylvania
 Chalfont station, a SEPTA train station located in Chalfont, Pennsylvania

People
 Alun Jones, Baron Chalfont, politician and historian, known as Lord Chalfont

See also 
 Chalfont Road, Oxford, England